Rajakkamangalam is a block or Panchayat Union of Kanyakumari district, India. It is one of the nine administrative divisions of the district of Kanyakumari. The current president of the Rajakkamangalam Panchayat is R.Ayyappan. It includes the following 15 village panchayats,

 Athikkattuvilai
 Elluvilai
 Ganapathipuram
 Kanyakulam
 Kesavanputhenthurai
 Melekrishnanputhoor
 Manakudi
 Northsoorankudy
 Putheri
 Peruvilai
 Parakkai
 Pallamthurai
 Melasankarankuzhi
 Rajakkamangalam Thurai
 Dharmapuram
Azhathangarai
Research Centre:
Centre for Marine Science and Technology is the research centre of Manonmaniam Sundaranar University for coastal aquaculture and marine biotechnology research activities. The centre is recognized by DST-FIST, UGC-SAP, DRS by the Government of India. The centre is one of the very few institutes in India offering M.Sc., M.Phil and Ph.D in marine biotechnology. The centre is the offshoot of Madurai Kamaraj University, and later it was formed as the Institute of Artemia Research and Training inaugurated by Dr. J. Jayalalitha during early 1990s and later renamed as the Institute of Coastal Area Studies, and now is called the Centre for Marine Science and Technology with advance research activities in the areas of marine microbiology, nanobiotechnology, marine pharmacology, marine biodiversity, micro-algal technology, molecular biology, etc.

The Rajakkamangalam estuary and Azhathangarai marsh land contains a coastal ecosystem with a mangroves habitat, sand dunes and sea turtle breeding site near Azhathangarai beach. The Rajakkamangalam estuary and Azhathangarai marsh land is considered one of the breeding and feeding grounds for many birds like painted stork, cormorant, spot billed pelicans, purple swaphen, dabchick, garganey, purple heron, open bill stork, black winged stilt, etc.

References
 Official Web Portal of Kanyakumari District

Cities and towns in Kanyakumari district